Alberta has provincial legislation allowing its municipalities to conduct municipal censuses between April 1 and June 30 inclusive. Municipalities choose to conduct their own censuses for multiple reasons such as to better inform municipal service planning and provision, to capitalize on per capita based grant funding from higher levels of government, or to simply update their populations since the last federal census.

Alberta began the year of 2018 with 352 municipalities. Of these, at least 38 conducted a municipal census in 2018. Alberta Municipal Affairs recognized those conducted by 37 of these municipalities. By municipal status, it recognized those conducted by 9 of Alberta's 18 cities, 11 of 109 towns, 4 of 86 villages, 3 of its 6 specialized municipalities, 1 of 63 municipal districts, 1 of its 8 improvement districts, and all 8 Metis settlements.

Some municipalities achieved population milestones as a result of their 2018 censuses. Blackfalds exceeded 10,000 residents, making it eligible for city status, while the Municipal District of Greenview No. 16 grew beyond the 6,000 mark for the first time.

Municipal census results 
The following summarizes the results of the numerous municipal censuses conducted in 2018.

Breakdowns

Urban and rural service areas

Strathcona County

Wood Buffalo

Hamlets 
The following is a list of hamlet and other unincorporated community populations determined by the 2018 municipal censuses conducted by Rocky View County, Strathcona County and the Regional Municipality (RM) of Wood Buffalo excluding the urban service areas of Fort McMurray and Sherwood Park that are presented above.

Shadow population counts 
Alberta Municipal Affairs defines shadow population as "temporary residents of a municipality who are employed by an industrial or commercial establishment in the municipality for a minimum of 30 days within a municipal census year." Improvement District No. 4 (Wateron) and the RM of Wood Buffalo conducted shadow population counts in 2018. The following presents the results of these counts for comparison with their concurrent municipal census results.

See also 
List of communities in Alberta

Notes

References

External links 
Alberta Municipal Affairs: Municipal Census & Population Lists
Statistics Canada: Census Program

Local government in Alberta
Municipal censuses in Alberta
2018 censuses
2018 in Alberta